Thomas John Herbert (October 28, 1894 – October 26, 1974) was an American Republican politician from Ohio. He was the 56th governor of Ohio.

Herbert was born in Cleveland, Ohio. During World War I Herbert served in the Army Air Service. While flying with No. 56 Squadron RAF in France, he was wounded in action 8 August 1918. He was awarded the British Distinguished Flying Cross & American Distinguished Service Cross.

After the war, Herbert returned to Ohio, where he graduated from Case Western Reserve University School of Law in 1919, and practiced law. He served as State Attorney General from 1939 to 1945. In the Republican landslide year of 1946, Herbert defeated incumbent governor Frank J. Lausche. Lausche defeated Herbert in the latter's bid for re-election two years later. Herbert served as a justice of the Ohio Supreme Court from 1957 until 1963. He suffered a stroke March 21, 1961, and decided not to run for re-election.

Herbert married Jeanette Judson of Cleveland on April 30, 1919, and they had four children. Jeanette died December 30, 1945. Herbert remarried, while Governor, Mildred Helen Stevenson of Indianapolis on January 3, 1948. They had one daughter. Mildred died in 1962. Herbert died October 26, 1974, two days before his 80th birthday, after years of illness.

His son John D. Herbert was Ohio State Treasurer for two terms, 1963 to 1971 and an unsuccessful candidate for Ohio Attorney General in 1970.

References

1894 births
1974 deaths
Republican Party governors of Ohio
Ohio Attorneys General
Justices of the Ohio Supreme Court
Case Western Reserve University School of Law alumni
Recipients of the Distinguished Flying Cross (United Kingdom)
Politicians from Cleveland
Politicians from Columbus, Ohio
United States Army Air Service pilots of World War I
20th-century American judges
20th-century American lawyers
20th-century American politicians